Edwin Jacob "Jake" Garn (born October 12, 1932) is an American politician and member of the Republican Party who served as a United States senator representing Utah from 1974 to 1993. Garn became the first sitting member of Congress to fly in space when he flew aboard the Space Shuttle Discovery as a payload specialist during NASA mission STS-51-D (April 12–19, 1985).

Prior to his time in Congress, he served as the mayor of Salt Lake City.

Early life and education
The son of a World War I pilot, Garn was born in Richfield, Utah. Garn also attended East High School, Clayton Middle School, and Uintah Elementary School. He earned a Bachelor of Science degree in business and finance from the University of Utah in 1955 and was a member of the Sigma Chi fraternity.

Career
Senator Garn is a former insurance executive. He served in the United States Navy as a Martin P5M Marlin pilot. He also served as a pilot of the 151st Air Refueling Group of the Utah Air National Guard, where he flew the Boeing KC-97L and KC-135A. He retired as a colonel in April 1979. He was promoted to brigadier general after his Space Shuttle mission. He had flown 17,000 hours in military aircraft when he flew in space.

Before his election to the Senate, Garn served on the Salt Lake City commission for four years and was elected as the mayor in 1971, entering office in 1972. He was the last Republican to hold that office to date. Garn was active in the Utah League of Cities and Towns and served as its president in 1972. In 1974, Garn was the first vice-president of the National League of Cities, and he served as its honorary president in 1975.

Garn was first elected to the Senate in 1974, succeeding retiring Republican Wallace Bennett, father of later Senator (and his eventual successor) Robert Bennett. Garn was re-elected to a second term in November 1980 with 74 percent of the vote, the largest victory in a statewide race in Utah history. Garn was re-elected a second time in 1986.

Though strongly anti-abortion, Garn joined U.S. Representative Henry Hyde of Illinois in resigning from the board of the United States Pro-Life Political Action Committee when the executive director of the organization, Peter Gemma, issued a "hit list" to target certain lawmakers who supported abortion rights. Garn and Hyde, the author of the Hyde Amendment, which limited abortions financed by Medicaid, said that "hit lists" are counterproductive because they create irrevocable discord among legislators, any of whom can be subject to a "single issue" attack of this kind by one interest group or another. Gemma said that he was surprised by the withdrawal of Garn and Hyde from the PAC committee but continued with plans to spend $650,000 for the 1982 elections on behalf of anti-abortion candidates.

Garn was chairman of the Senate Banking, Housing, and Urban Affairs Committee and served on three subcommittees: Housing and Urban Affairs, Financial Institutions, and International Finance and Monetary Policy. He also was a member of the Senate Appropriations Committee and served as chairman of the HUD-Independent Agencies Subcommittee. He served on four other Appropriations subcommittees: Energy and Water Resources, Defense, Military Construction, and Interior. Garn served as a member of the Republican leadership from 1979 to 1984 as secretary of the Republican Conference.

His Institute of Finance has been called a "hot tub of influence peddling".

Garn retired from the Senate in 1992. He is a supporter of the National Popular Vote Interstate Compact.

Savings and loan
As chairman of the Senate Banking Committee, Garn was co-author of the Garn–St. Germain Depository Institutions Act of 1982, the law that partially deregulated the savings and loan industry and attempted to forestall the looming Savings and Loan crisis.

Spaceflight
Garn asked to fly on the Space Shuttle because he was head of the Senate appropriations subcommittee that dealt with NASA, and had extensive aviation experience. He had previously flown a B-2 Spirit prototype and driven a new Army tank. He began publicly asking NASA about flying on the Shuttle in 1981, and the agency had long planned to fly "citizen passengers" such as artists, journalists, entertainers, and the Teacher in Space Project, but the November 1984 announcement that a member of Congress would go to space surprised most observers. Garn said that flying on the Shuttle would be a fact-finding trip: "I do really think that it is a necessity that Congressmen check things out that they vote for and make certain that funds are being spent adequately. It might be necessary to have a Senator kick the tire".

STS-51-D was launched from and returned to land at the Kennedy Space Center, Florida. Its primary objective was to deploy two communications satellites, and to perform electrophoresis and echocardiograph operations in space in addition to a number of other experiments. As a payload specialist, Garn's role on the mission was as a congressional observer and as a subject for medical experiments on space motion sickness.

The space sickness Garn experienced during the journey was so severe that a scale for space sickness was jokingly based on him, where "one Garn" is the highest possible level of sickness. Some NASA astronauts who opposed the payload specialist program, such as Mike Mullane, believed that Garn's space sickness was evidence of the inappropriateness of flying people with little training. Garn was in excellent physical condition, however, and began flying at the age of 16. Astronaut Charles F. Bolden described Garn as "the ideal candidate to do it, because he was a veteran Navy combat pilot who had more flight hours than anyone in the Astronaut Office". Fellow 51-D payload specialist Charles D. Walker—who also suffered from space sickness on the flight despite having flown before—stated that:

The Jake Garn Mission Simulator and Training Facility, NASA's prime training facility for astronauts in the Shuttle and Space Station programs, is named after him.

Upon his return, he co-wrote the 1989 novel Night Launch. The book centers around terrorists taking control of the Space Shuttle Discovery during the first NASA–USSR Space Shuttle flight.

Personal life
Garn married Hazel Rhae Thompson in 1957. Together, they had four children: Jacob, Susan, Ellen, and Jeffrey. Hazel died in an automobile accident in 1976. In 1977, Garn married Kathleen Brewerton, who had a son, Brook, from a previous marriage. Jake and Kathleen had two children together, Matthew and Jennifer. Kathleen died on May 31, 2018. He is a member of the Church of Jesus Christ of Latter-day Saints.

In 1986, Garn donated a kidney to his 27-year-old daughter, Susan, who was experiencing progressive kidney failure as a result of diabetes.

References

External links

 
 Spacefacts biography of Jake Garn
 Page with true origin of "Garn scale"
 

|-

|-

|-

|-

|-

1932 births
American astronauts
American astronaut-politicians
Latter Day Saints from Utah
Living people
Mayors of Salt Lake City
United States Air Force generals
United States Navy officers
Republican Party United States senators from Utah
David Eccles School of Business alumni
Utah Republicans
Organ transplant donors
People from Richfield, Utah
Space Shuttle program astronauts
Members of Congress who became lobbyists